The 1998 MAC men's basketball tournament, a part of the 1997–98 NCAA Division I men's basketball season, took place at SeaGate Centre in Toledo, Ohio.  Its winner received the Mid-American Conference's automatic bid to the 1998 NCAA tournament. It was a single-elimination tournament with three rounds and the top eight MAC teams invited to participate. No teams received byes in the tournament. Ball State, the MAC West Division co-champion, received the number one seed in the tournament.

Tournament

Seeds
 Ball State
 Western Michigan
 Akron
 Eastern Michigan
 Toledo
 Kent State
 Miami
 Marshall

Bracket 

* Overtime period

References 

Tournament
Mid-American Conference men's basketball tournament
MAC men's basketball tournament